The GO 22 class is a series of two Floating dry docks of the Marina Militare.

Ships

References

External links
 Ships Marina Militare website

Drydocks
Auxiliary ships of the Italian Navy
Ships built in Italy
Floating drydocks
1935 ships